Silpho is a village and civil parish in the Scarborough 
district of the county of North Yorkshire, England.

According to the 2001 UK census, Silpho parish had a population of 31. At the 2011 Census the population remained less than 100. Details are included in the civil parish of Suffield-cum-Everley.

The hill leading to Silpho from Hackness, was the final climb of 1.5 km (Cote de Silpho), on Stage 3 of the 2018 Tour de Yorkshire

The parish council is Hackness & Harwood Dale Group Parish Council which covers the six parishes of Broxa-cum-Troutsdale, Darncombe-cum-Langdale End, Hackness, Harwood Dale, Silpho and Suffield-cum-Everley.

References

External links

Hackness & Harwood Dale Group Parish Council website

Villages in North Yorkshire
Civil parishes in North Yorkshire